This is a list of wars that Albanian states and Albanian forces have been involved in.

Medieval Albania: Principality of Arbanon to the Fall of Shkodër (1190–1479)

Ottoman Albania and the Albanian National Awakening (1479–1912)

Independence to the end of the First World War (1912–1918)

Interwar Period (1918–1939)

Second World War and Cold War (1939–1991)

Post Cold War era (1991–)

See also
List of wars involving Albanian rebel groups in the post-Cold War era

References

Citations

Bibliography
 

Albania
Wars